A French family name of Norman origin mainly found among northern French as well as their descendants among French Canadians, Québécois, or Cajuns.
It is derived from the old Norse for "wood" (Lundr), and is based in the commune of La Londe in the Seine-Maritime department of Normandy, France. 
with variants such as: Lalonde, Lalondes, La Londe, Lalande, La Lande, de Lalonde, des Lalondes, de Lalonde, de Lalande and many more.

Notable persons bearing this family name include:

 Amy Lalonde (born 1975), Canadian television personality
 Bob LaLonde (1922–2015), American politician
 Brice Lalonde (born 1946), French politician
 Catherine Lalonde (born 1974), Canadian poet and journalist
 Daniel Lalonde (born 1963), Canadian businessman, CEO of brands in France
 Derek Lalonde (born 1972), National Hockey League head coach
 Donny Lalonde (born 1960), Canadian boxer
 Francine Lalonde (1940–2014), Canadian politician, MP for La Pointe-de-l'Île
 François Lalonde (born 1955), Canadian mathematician
 Gisèle Lalonde (born 1933), Canadian politician, mayor of Vanier from 1985 to 1991
 Jean-Marc Lalonde (born 1935), Canadian politician, member of Legislative Assembly of Ontario
 Jeremy Lalonde (born 1981), Canadian filmmaker
 Larry LaLonde (born 1968), guitarist for rock group Primus
 Marc Lalonde (born 1929), Canadian politician, author of the Lalonde report 
 Marie-France Lalonde (born 1971), Canadian politician, former member of Legislative Assembly of Ontario, MP for Orleans
 Michèle Lalonde (1937–2021), French Canadian writer
 Newsy Lalonde (1887–1970), Canadian ice hockey player
 Pierre Lalonde (1941–2016), Canadian singer and television host
 Raymond "Lala" Lalonde (1940-2022), American politician and educator
 Robert Lalonde (born 1947), Canadian actor and writer
 Robert LaLonde (economist) (1958–2018), American economist
 Ron Lalonde (born 1952), Canadian ice hockey player
 Rose and Roxy Lalonde, fictional characters in the webcomic Homestuck
 Shawn Lalonde (born 1990), Canadian ice hockey player

Delalande, variant 
Michel Richard Delalande (1657–1726), French Baroque composer and organist who was in the service of King Louis XIV.
Pierre Antoine Delalande (1787–1823), French naturalist, taxidermist, explorer and painter.

Origin of the name 
It is a reference to one of the approximately 100 places called La Londe in northern France. In Old French it meant "grove, wood", itself from Old Norse lundr (accusative lundi) "grove".
Lalanne and Lannes (plural) are the Gascon cognates and equivalents to Lalonde, based in southwestern France.

See also
Lalonde report, 1974 report on the health of Canadians
La Londe
Lalanne (surname) or Lannes, the Gascon family name equivalent

References

Surnames
Surnames of French origin
French-language surnames